The Grateful Dead were an American rock band established in 1965.

Grateful Dead may also refer to:

Grateful Dead band related topics
 The Grateful Dead (album), their debut album (1967)
 Grateful Dead (album), also known as Skull and Roses (1971)
 Grateful Dead Records, a record label established by the band in 1973
 The Grateful Dead Movie, a 1977 concert film shot mostly in 1974
 The Grateful Dead Movie Soundtrack, a live album recorded at the same concerts as The Grateful Dead Movie
 Grateful Dead Archive, an archive of the band's music and other artifacts
 The Grateful Dead Channel, a Sirius XM satellite radio channel

Other uses
 Grateful dead (folklore), a motif from folklore

See also

 
 Grateful Dead discography
 List of Grateful Dead members
 Unfinished Grateful Dead album that was being worked on in 1995 when Jerry Garcia died
 The Best of the Grateful Dead, 2015 compilation album
 The Best of the Grateful Dead Live, 2018 compilation album
 The Story of the Grateful Dead, 2020 LP box set
 
 Ungrateful Dead (disambiguation)
 Grateful (disambiguation)
 Dead (disambiguation)